Internet in Korea may refer to:
Internet in North Korea
Internet in South Korea